Funland may refer to:

Amusement parks
Funland Amusement Park (Little Rock, Arkansas), U.S.
Funland Hayling Island, near Portsmouth, England
Funland Park, Tolyatti, Russia
Funland, a former amusement arcade originally named SegaWorld London, in London, England
Funland (Rehoboth Beach, Delaware), U.S.

Arts and entertainment
Funland (TV series), a 2005 British TV comedy/thriller series
Funland, an American grunge band
Funland (film), a 1987 American dark comedy film about a revengeful clown
Funland (album), a 2009 album by Unknown Instructors
Funland, a 1981 album by Bram Tchaikovsky
Bob Funland, a fictional character on the American TV series Family Guy
Uncle Art's Funland, or Funland, a puzzle and entertainment feature in newspapers
''Funland (novel), a horror novel by Richard Laymon

See also